Richard Allan Watson (23 February 1931 – 18 September 2019) was an American philosopher, speleologist and author.

Biography

Watson taught philosophy at Washington University in St. Louis for forty years. He was considered one of the foremost living authorities on Descartes.  He was an Emeritus Professor of Philosophy for Washington University.

Watson earned a degree in geology specializing in "paleoclimatology of 10,000 years ago." This involved the development of agrarian societies in the Fertile Crescent. From July 1965 to July 1967, he was president of the Cave Research Foundation.

His book, Cogito, Ergo Sum: a life of René Descartes is a travelogue in the form of following Descartes's travels around Europe. It was chosen by the New York Public Library as one of its "25 Books to Remember from 2002."

Criticism of animal rights

Watson authored the article Self-consciousness and the Rights of Nonhuman Animals and Nature, which argued that most animals do not have rights such as the rights for freedom or from unnecessary suffering because they are not moral agents, do not possess self-consciousness, free will, or have the capability for understanding moral principles or the physical capability to act according to given principles of duty. According to Watson, an animal deserving of rights must have a well developed brain to discern "right from wrong".

Selected publications 
Richard A. Watson's publications include the following books and articles:
 Was chosen by the New York Public library as one of "25 Books to Remember from 2002"
Has been translated into Italian
Has been translated into nine languages.
. The biography of the first person to cross the Falls on a wire, and the first person(a woman) to go over the Falls in a barrel. The French translation has featured at the Saint-Malo Ettonants voyageurs Festival International du Lirre in 1997, where it won a translation award.

 Watson, Richard A. The Downfall of Cartesianism. The Hague: Martinus Nijhoff, 1966.
 Watson, R.A. The breakdown of Cartesian metaphysics. - Atlantic Highlands (N.J.) : Humanities press intern., 1987. - XII, 240 p. Bibliogr.: p. 223-235. Name ind.: p. 237-240.
 RICHARD A. WATSON.  The Breakdown of Cartesian Metaphysics. Hackett Publishing Company, 1998. 
Representational Ideas from Plato to Patricia Churchland (Kluwer Academic Publishers)
Under Plowman's Floor
The Runner
The Longest Cave (with Roger W. Brucker) (hb Alfred A. Knopf, pb Southern Illinois University Press)
 The high road to Pyrrhonism / Ed. by Watson R.A., Force J.E. - San Diego: Hill, 1980. - XIV, 385 p. - (Studies in Hume a. Scott. philosophy; 2) Indices.: p. 369-385.

Articles 
Watson is the author of the Encyclopædia Britannica article on Descartes.
 "Berkeley in a Cartesian Context". // Revue Internationale de Philosophie 65 (1963), 381–94.
 "Berkeley in the Cartesian Tradition." Papers of the Michigan Academy of Science, Arts and Letters 48 (1963):587-97.
 "The Breakdown of Cartesian Metaphysics." Journal of the History of Philosophy 1 (1963):177-97.
 "Self-Consciousness and the Rights of Nonhuman Animals and Nature". Environmental Ethics (1979) Vol. 1, N 2. pp. 99-129.
 "What moves the mind: An excursion in Cartesian dualism". Amer. philos. quart. - Oxford, 1982. - vol. 19, N 1. - p. 73-81.
  "Having ideas". Amer. philos. quart. - Oxford, 1994. - Vol. 31, N 3. - P. 185–198.
 "Malebranche and Arnauld on ideas" // Mod. schoolman. - Saint Louis, 1994. - Vol. 71, N 4. - P. 259–270.

References

Notes

External links

 Amazon's Complete Selection of Richard A. Watson's Books
 

1931 births
2019 deaths
American male non-fiction writers
American philosophers
American speleologists
Critics of animal rights
Descartes scholars
Washington University in St. Louis faculty